SWB may refer to:
 
 , blackout which occurs when all phases of a breathhold dive have taken place in shallow water
 Börse Stuttgart, Stuttgart Stock Exchange code
 Maore dialect, ISO 639-3 code for the Maore dialect of the Comorian language
 Smith & Wesson's stock listing symbol on the New York Stock Exchange
 Subjective well-being
A short wheelbase vehicle
Slyck Wagner Brown, a professional wrestler.